HMS Shakespeare was a Thornycroft type flotilla leader of the British Royal Navy. She was built by J I Thornycroft from 1916 to 1917 as the lead ship of her class, launching in July 1917 and completing in October 1917.

Shakespeare served in the Harwich Force during the rest of the First World War, during which she survived being mined. Shakespeare served in the Baltic during the British intervention in the Russian Civil War in 1919. She went into reserve in 1925 and was sold for scrap in 1936.

Design and construction
The Thornycroft type or Shakespeare-class leaders, were like the similar and contemporary Admiralty type (also known as the Scott-class) were designed to meet a requirement from Admiral Sir John Jellicoe, commander of the Grand Fleet, for a large, fast and heavily armed flotilla leader to match and outclass rumoured large German destroyers.

Design displacement was  normal and  full load.

The class had a main gun armament consisted of five 4.7 in (120 mm)/45 calibre BL Mark I guns, on CP VI mountings capable of elevating to 30 degrees, arranged in two superfiring pairs fore and aft of the superstructure with the remaining gun positioned on a platform between the funnels. Shakespeares anti-aircraft armament consisted of a single  gun on a platform abaft the rear funnel. Torpedo armament consisted of two triple mounts for 21-inch (533 mm) torpedo tubes between the 3-inch AA gun and the rear pair of 4.7-inch guns. Four depth charges were carried.

A third was ordered in April 1917 and four more in April 1918. Shakespeare was laid down at Thonycroft's Woolston, Hampshire shipyard on 2 October 1916, was launched on 7 July 1917 and commissioned on 10 October 1917.

Service
After commissioning, Shakespeare had defects repaired at Portsmouth before joining the 10th Destroyer Flotilla as part of the Harwich Force on 14 November 1917. On 31 May 1918, Shakespeare struck a mine off Harwich, which killed one of her crew. She was towed back into port by the cruiser  and was under repair at Chatham Dockyard until 21 October 1918. Shakespeare returned to the 10th Flotilla after repair, and was still part of that flotilla at the end of the war on 11 November 1918.

The Royal Navy's destroyer forces were reorganised after the end of the war, with Shakespeare becoming leader of the newly established 2nd Destroyer Flotilla, based at Rosyth  in March 1919. Shakespeare made several deployments to the Baltic sea as part of the British operations in the Baltic during the Russian Civil War. On 18 May 1919, British forces operating near Seskar in the Gulf of Finland support of Estonian forces and watching the Bolshevik Fleet based at Kronstadt, spotted a sortie by four Bolshevik minesweepers, covered by the destroyer . Shakespeare, together with the cruiser  and the destroyers  and  set off to intercept the Bolshevik forces, which withdrew behind minefields and the protection of shore batteries. In an exchange of fire, Gavriil received splinter damage from British near misses, while the British ships were unharmed.

On 21 June 1919, the ships of the German High Seas Fleet, interned at Scapa Flow, was scuttled by their crews. The British Fleet was away from Scapa at the time, but hurried back on hearing reports of the scuttling. Shakespeare was one of the British ships that responded to the alarm, and on arrival at Scapa, attempted to the German cruiser  under tow. Emden was beached to avoid sinking. Shakespeare was again deployed to the Baltic from 12 August 1919, where the British forces were supporting an Estonian offensive against Saint Petersburg. Despite the support from the Royal Navy, the Estonian assault failed. This deployment ended in November 1919, with Shakespeare returning to British waters.

Shakespeare returned to the Baltic in July 1920, but hostilities between Britain and the Bolshevik forces had ceased. In May 1921, the Royal Navy's destroyer forces were again reorganised, with smaller flotillas of eight destroyers and a leader replacing the previous large flotillas, with Shakespeare joined the newly formed 6th Destroyer Flotilla as leader. Shakespeare was deployed to Irish waters from 9 May to 22 June 1921, as the Irish War of Independence continued.

Shakespeare entered reserve at the Nore on 21 December 1925, at first serving as leader of the reserve 9th Flotilla, with a reduced crew. In 1927–1928, as an economy measure, reserve destroyers were transferred to a centralised Maintenance Reserve, with most reserve destroyers having no crews assigned and only undergoing essential repair work. In fact, however, the resources (both manpower and financial) allocated to the uptake of reserve destroyers was inadequate, and their condition deteriorated, so that most of them never returned to active service. Shakespeare was towed from Chatham to Rosyth in March 1933, and on  19 August 1936, was one of a number of old warships transferred to the shipbreaker Thos. W. Ward in exchange for the old ocean liner , which the Royal Navy wanted as a training ship. Shakespeare was handed over to Wards on 2 September that year and scrapped at their Jarrow works.

Pennant numbers

Notes

Citations

References

 
 
 
 
 
 
 
 
 
 

 

Thornycroft type destroyer leaders
1917 ships
Ships built in Southampton
Ships built by John I. Thornycroft & Company